Himalaya: Caravan  is a 1999 Nepali film directed by Éric Valli and was funded through based in France corporations. It was the first Nepalese film to be nominated in the Best Foreign Film category at the 72nd Academy Awards.

The film is a narrative on both the traditions and the impermanent nature of human struggle to retain and express power in the face of the gods. "The gods' triumph" is the call that echoes at the end of the film and expresses the balancing of karmic destinies. The extreme environment of the Himalayas is magnificently contrasted to the delicacy of humanity and the beauty of Tibetan culture.

The film depicts not only the life style of the upper Dolpo people of the mid western uphills of Nepal but also their traditional customs, for example celestial burial.

Himalaya was shot in widescreen over nine months on location in a region that can only be reached on foot, with all but two characters played by real chiefs, lamas and local villagers. Director Éric Valli has lived in Nepal since 1983 and is also a photographer and author. His work is regularly published in National Geographic Magazine , GEO magazine and Life magazines.

Plot 
Himalaya is a story set against the backdrop of the Nepalese Himalayas. At an altitude of five thousand metres in the remote mountain region of Dolpa, Himalaya is the story of villagers who take a caravan of yaks across the mountains, carrying rock salt from the high plateau down to the lowlands to trade for grain.

At the beginning of the film, Lhakpa, the heir to the chieftainship of the tribe is revealed to have died in a botched attempt to navigate a shortcut.

An annual event, the caravan provides the grain that the villagers depend on to survive the winter. The film unfolds as a story of rivalry based on misunderstanding and distrust, between the aging chief, Tinle, and the young daring herdsman, Karma, who is both a friend and a rival to the chief's family, as they struggle for leadership of the caravan. The elders of the tribe assert that Karma should lead the caravan in the absence of Lhakpa, but Tinle objects and insists that someone else should lead the caravan.

Karma, seeking to prove himself as a worthy leader, departs a few days before the scheduled departure of the caravan, leaving behind only the youngest and oldest members of the tribe. Karma's relatives plead with Karma not to leave as leaving before the scheduled departure of the caravan was seen as deceitful. Karma does not heed this warning, and soon the elders of the tribe congregate to determine which households still had remaining salt. Tinle decides to lead the remainder of the community in a caravan with the remaining salt, recruiting his monastic son, Norbou, to join his endeavours, on the original set day of departure. Tinle soon catches up with Karma's caravan, despite Karma having taken a shortcut and having left days earlier. Tinle asserts his leadership, and Karma acts as a role model to Tinle's grandson Tserin. Tinle predicts an oncoming snowstorm and immediately commands the caravan to depart immediately, which Karma refutes as the sky is clear. Karma stays behind as Tinle and the rest of the caravan departs.

When the snowstorm sets, Tinle grows weary and exhausted, and in ensuring that the caravan is remaining a cohesive unit, Tinle collapses in the snow. Karma arrives, having realized his mistake, and carries Tinle to the front of the caravan. The caravan is successful in reaching a landmark and survives the snowstorm, but Tinle collapses at the landmark, asking to be left to die. The leaders of the caravan agree, indicating that Tinle, as masters of the mountains, should honor his wishes to peacefully pass away in the mountains rather than the flatlands.

The film ends with Tinle's monastic son, Norbou, honoring the legacy of Tinle by painting a monastery wall with the caravan's adventures.

Characters 

 Thinle Lhondup as Tinle, elderly village leader
 Lhakpa as Tinle's son and present heir 
 Tserin / Passang as Tinle's grandson and future heir
 Lhakpa Tsamchoe as Pema, Lhakpa's wife
 Norbou as Tinle's monastic son 
 Karma as rival leader to the Tinle clan

Reception 
It has a metacritic score of 73, with mostly positive reviews.

SBS gave the film 3.5/5, saying that "The story of Himalaya is a timeless one. French director Eric Valli tells it like a legend, and it's one he knows well", and that it is "It's a simple but quite affecting saga".

See also
 Himalayan salt
 Tibet-Nepal salt trade route
 The Saltmen of Tibet

References

External links

1999 films
1990s adventure films
1999 drama films
Nepali-language films
Films set in Nepal
Films shot in Nepal
1990s German-language films
Tibetan-language films
Films scored by Bruno Coulais
1999 multilingual films
Nepalese multilingual films
Films directed by Éric Valli
Films produced by Jacques Perrin